Ishq is a word meaning love.

Ishq may also refer to:

 Ishq (1997 film), a Bollywood film
 Ishq (album), 2001 album by Junoon
 Ishq (2012 film), a Telugu film 
 Ishq (2019 film), a Malayalam film
 Ishq (2021 film), a Telugu film

See also
Ishqiya, 2010 Indian film
Dedh Ishqiya, 2014 Indian film, sequel of Ishqiya